Milan Kostourek (born January 9, 1983) is a Czech professional ice hockey forward playing for Höchstadter EC of the Oberliga.

Kostourek previously played in the Czech Extraliga for HC České Budějovice and PSG Berani Zlín, playing in fourteen regular season games and eight playoff games respectively.
 He also played in the Tipsport Liga for HK 36 Skalica and the Polska Hokej Liga for Cracovia Krakow.

References

External links

1983 births
Living people
HC Benátky nad Jizerou players
Bracknell Bees players
Motor České Budějovice players
MKS Cracovia (ice hockey) players
Czech ice hockey forwards
BK Havlíčkův Brod players
KLH Vajgar Jindřichův Hradec players
HC Kometa Brno players
Lausitzer Füchse players
Milton Keynes Lightning players
BK Mladá Boleslav players
Piráti Chomutov players
HK 36 Skalica players
Sportspeople from České Budějovice
HC Tábor players
PSG Berani Zlín players
Czech expatriate ice hockey players in Slovakia
Czech expatriate ice hockey players in Germany
Czech expatriate sportspeople in Italy
Czech expatriate sportspeople in Poland
Czech expatriate sportspeople in England
Expatriate ice hockey players in Italy
Expatriate ice hockey players in Poland
Expatriate ice hockey players in England